The Vișeu in northern Romania is a left tributary of the river Tisza. Its source is in the Rodna Mountains. It passes through the following villages, communes and cities: Borșa (city), Moisei (commune), Vișeu de Sus (city), Vișeu de Jos (commune), Leordina (commune), Petrova (commune), Bistra (village), Valea Vișeului (village). In Valea Vișeului village, the river flows into the Tisza.

Tributaries
The following rivers are tributaries to the river Vișeu (from source to mouth):

Left: Fântâna, Negoescu, Repedea, Pârâul Pietros, Izvorul Dragoș, Izvorul Negru, Drăguiasa, Bocicoel, Spânu, Mârza, Plăiuț

Right: Cercănel, Cisla, Vaser, Valea Vinului, Valea Morii, Ruscova, Frumușeaua, Bistra, Runcu Mare

References

Rivers of Romania
 
Rivers of Maramureș County